Friedrich Fülleborn (September 13, 1866 – September 9, 1933) was a physician who specialized in tropical medicine and parasitology. He was a native of Kulm, West Prussia, which today is known as Chełmno, Poland.

He studied medicine and natural sciences in Berlin, where one of his instructors was Heinrich Wilhelm Waldeyer (1835–1921). From 1896 onward, he was a military physician assigned to the Schutztruppe in German East Africa. In 1898–1900 he participated in the Nyassa- und Kingagebirgs Expedition to the southern part of the colony, where he conducted anthropological and ethnographic research.

In 1901 he became director of the Department of Tropical Hygiene and Tropical Medicine at the Hamburg Institute for Marine and Tropical Diseases. In 1908 he was appointed by Georg Thilenius (1868–1937) of the Hamburg Museum of Ethnology to head the "Hamburg South Seas Expedition", a scientific mission to the South Pacific. In 1930 he succeeded Bernhard Nocht (1857–1945) as director of the Hamburg Institute for Marine and Tropical Diseases, a position he maintained until his death in 1933.

During his career he took several tropical medical study trips to India, East Asia, the West Indies, etc. He is especially known for his filarian research and as an instructor of tropical medicine classes in Hamburg.

While working with dogs in Hamburg, he described "autoinfection" and discovered the migratory route taken by the parasite Strongyloides stercoralis prior to ending up in the intestine. The term "Fülleborn's method" is a procedure for examining parasitic ova in faecal matter.

Legacy
Fülleborn is commemorated in the scientific name of a number of species including the East African chameleon, Trioceros fuelleborni, the cichlid Labeotropheus fuelleborni and the bird Fülleborn's longclaw (Macronyx fuelleborni).

Published works 
 Das deutsche Njassa- und Ruwuma-gebiet, land und leute, nebst bemerkungen über die Schire-Länder. : Mit benutzung von ergebnissen der Njassa- und Kingagebirgs-expedition der Hermann und Elise geb. Heckmann Wentzel-stiftung (1906) – The German Nyassa and Ruwuma region, the country and its people; along with remarks on the Shire-regions: written with the use of results from the Nyassa and Kinga Mountains expedition of the Hermann and Elise Heckmann (née Wentzel) Foundation.
 Filariosen des Menschen (1929) – Human filariasis.

Sources
 This article incorporates translated text from an equivalent article at the German Wikipedia, whose sources include: Stefan Wulf: Fülleborn, Friedrich. In: Hamburgische Biography, Volume 5, Wallenstein, Göttingen 2010 , p 123-125
 Dorlands Medical Dictionary (definition of eponym)

References

External links
 

1866 births
1933 deaths
German military doctors
German parasitologists
People from Chełmno
People from the Province of Prussia
Schutztruppe personnel
German tropical physicians